EML Sulev (M312) was a  of the Estonian Navy  Mineships Division.

Introduction
The minehunter Sulev was part of the Estonian Navy Mineships Division and also the second modernized Lindau-class minehunter. A cross-bow is on the coat of arms of the vessel which was also a friend of Kalevipoeg Sulev's son weapon. The ships motto is in Latin "Certum Est" which means in English "Secure it is". The coat of arms was designed by Priit Herodes. In August 2001 on the 5th Kuressaare naval day a cooperation contract was signed between the Kuressaare city council and the minehunter Sulev which gave the vessel a right to wear the Kuressaare town coat of arms and to introduce the city in all foreign harbors across the world.

History
Sulev was built in the Burmester shipyard in Bremen, West Germany. The vessel was launched on 16 February 1957 and she entered service a year later on 24 April 1958. She was to become the first German naval ship built since the end of the Second World War in Germany. The ship's name comes from a city called Lindau in Germany and marks also the minehunter class name which has in total of 18 vessels. Originally Lindau was a minesweeper but was transformed into a minehunter in late 1970s. The German Navy decommissioned Lindau and one of her sister ships, Cuxhaven, on 9 October 2003 and gave the vessels to the Estonian Navy to operate. On the ceremony the vessel received an Estonian name Sulev. The Estonian Navy decommissioned Sulev on 26 March 2009.

References

External links

Estonian Navy

Ships built in Bremen (state)
1957 ships
Cold War minesweepers of Germany
Lindau-class minesweepers of the Estonian Navy
Estonian Mineships Division